Fraserosphenodon is an extinct genus of sphenodontian from the Late Triassic of the United Kingdom. It contains a single species, Fraserosphenodon latidens.

References 

Prehistoric reptile genera
Sphenodontia